Udea angustalis is a moth in the family Crambidae. It was described by Paul Dognin in 1905. It is found from southern Mexico to Ecuador's Loja Province, Colombia and Bolivia.

The wingspan is about 22 mm.

References

Moths described in 1905
angustalis